Tierra Sangre is a Philippine soap opera aired on PTV (later RPN) produced by Viva Television. It stars Charito Solis, Bobby Andrews and Jennifer Sevilla.

Cast

Sangre family
Charito Solis as Doña Alfonsita Sangre (the matriarch)
Bobby Andrews as Cesar Sangre (son of Miguel and Aurora)
Dexter Doria as Margarita Sangre (wife of Juancho)
Melissa Mendez as Soledad Sangre (wife of Miguel)
Chesca Diaz as Minerva Sangre (daughter of Miguel and Aurora)
Orestes Ojeda as Miguel Sangre (most trusted son of Alfonsita)
Michelle Chuang as Cathy Sangre (daughter of Margarita and Juancho)
Rez Cortez as Juancho Sangre (the son of Alfonsita)
Michael Gomez as Allan Sangre (son of Margarita and Juancho)

De Asis family (the illegitimate Sangres)
Jennifer Sevilla as Jean de Asis
Kim delos Santos as Jeanette de Asis
Melisse "Mumay" Santiago as Julie de Asis

Friends of the De Asis family
Mymy Davao as Rebecca
Sherry Lara as Yuning

Other cast
Amy Robles as Manang Basyon
Ama Quiambao

See also
List of programs aired by People's Television Network
List of programs previously broadcast by Radio Philippines Network

External links
 

Radio Philippines Network original programming
People's Television Network original programming
Philippine drama television series
1990s Philippine television series
1996 Philippine television series debuts
1999 Philippine television series endings
Television series by Viva Television
Filipino-language television shows